Alexis is a village in Mercer and Warren counties in Illinois, United States. The population was 793 at the 2020 census.

The Mercer County portion is part of the Davenport–Moline–Rock Island, IA-IL Metropolitan Statistical Area.

History
Alexis was originally called Alexandria or Alexandria Station, and under the latter names was laid out in 1870 when the railroad was extended to that point. After learning of another Illinois town named Alexander, the founders wanted a new name. Around this time, Grand Duke Alexis was visiting the country, after whom the town was renamed.

Geography
Alexis is located on the border between Warren and Mercer counties at  (41.063433, -90.554951). Approximately four north-south blocks of the village are in Warren County, while two blocks north to south are in Mercer County. There are approximately six blocks measuring east to west in the village. In the 2000 census, 499 of Alexis' 863 residents (57.8%) lived in Warren County and 364 (42.2%) lived in Mercer County.

Most of the village drains south to a tributary of Middle Henderson Creek, a west-flowing tributary of Henderson Creek, which continues west to the Mississippi River south of Oquawka. The northernmost part of the village drains north to Toms Creek, another tributary of Middle Henderson Creek.

Demographics

As of the census of 2000, there were 863 people, 361 households, and 246 families residing in the village. The racial makeup of the village was 99.65% White, 0.12% from other races, and 0.23% from two or more races. Hispanic or Latino of any race were 2.20% of the population.

There were 361 households, out of which 28.3% had children under the age of 18 living with them, 58.7% were married couples living together, 6.6% had a female householder with no husband present, and 31.6% were non-families. 28.8% of all households were made up of individuals, and 15.5% had someone living alone who was 65 years of age or older. The average household size was 2.39 and the average family size was 2.94.

In the village, the population was spread out, with 24.3% under the age of 18, 7.0% from 18 to 24, 25.5% from 25 to 44, 24.1% from 45 to 64, and 19.1% who were 65 years of age or older. The median age was 40 years. For every 100 females, there were 88.0 males. For every 100 females age 18 and over, there were 88.7 males.

The median income for a household in the village was $36,705, and the median income for a family was $46,364. Males had a median income of $32,419 versus $19,000 for females. The per capita income for the village was $17,059. About 4.0% of families and 5.9% of the population were below the poverty line, including 4.0% of those under age 18 and 3.8% of those age 65 or over.

Economy
Alexis Fire Equipment, a manufacturer of fire engines and fire fighting related equipment, is the village's largest employer.

Law enforcement
 Alexis Police Department
 Mercer County Sheriff's Office
 Warren County Sheriff's Office

See also

 List of municipalities in Illinois

References

External links

Villages in Mercer County, Illinois
Villages in Warren County, Illinois
Villages in Illinois
Galesburg, Illinois micropolitan area
Populated places established in 1870
1870 establishments in Illinois